Pateman is an English surname. Notable people with the surname include:

Carole Pateman (born 1940), English academic, political theorist and feminist
Eric Pateman, Canadian chef
George Pateman (1910–73), English footballer 
John Arthur Joseph Pateman (1926–2011), English microbiologist and geneticist
Matthew Pateman, English academic
Matthew Pateman (singer), English singer and actor
Robert Pateman (born 1856), Australian cricketer
Steve Pateman, English banker

English-language surnames